Yll Limani (born 24 September 1994) is a Kosovo-Albanian singer and songwriter.

Life and career

1994–2020: Early life and career beginnings 

Yll Limani was born on 24 September 1994 into an Albanian family in the city of Pristina, then part of the FR Yugoslavia, present Kosovo. His father, Mufail Limani, was a member of the Albanian band Minatori. The singer's public singing debut was at the first season of The Voice of Albania in 2011, followed by an appearance on the 9th edition of the Albanian music contest Top Fest in 2012. Upon a three-year hiatus, Limani's first single as a lead artist, "Single" featuring Kosovo-Albanian rapper Gent Fatali, was released in January 2015. The singer made his first appearance on Albania's Top 100 chart with "" in July 2016, which debuted and peaked within the top three. Finishing in third place, the single peaked at number 34 in March 2017 as his second charting record in Albania.

In July 2019, he scored his second number-one single with the release of "Nuk po kalojka", a collaboration with Albanian composers Aida Baraku and Armend Rexhepagiqi alongside Macedonian producer Darko Dimitrov. The Sunny Hill Festival in Pristina approached Limani a month later, and went on to perform at the festival sharing stage with other acclaimed artists, such as Miley Cyrus, Calvin Harris and Dua Lipa.

2021–present: Lshoja zanin and continued success 

Limani was featured on Cricket's singles "Ndoshta" and "Pray" in February 2021 with the former peaking at number one and the latter becoming a top 30 single in Albania. He released "A ki me rrejt", his first single as a lead artist in over six months after "Leje", in April 2021 and reached number two. The follow-up collaborations, "E di" and "Marre", with Albanian singer Elvana Gjata were released in June 2021 and "E di" peaked at number one for three consecutive weeks. In October 2021, Limani announced that he had started working on his debut extended play. A month later, he was invited to join Swiss rapper Loredana's Red Bull Symphonic concert in Lucerne, Switzerland. Throughout the year, the singer contributed to Albanian singer Arilena Ara's debut studio album, Pop Art The Album. His debut extended play, Lshoja zanin, was eventually released on 5 December 2021. "Lshoja zonin" from the record peaked at number one on the Albanian Top 100. Limani contributed credited songwriting to the Cypriot entry, "Ela", for the Eurovision Song Contest 2022 by Greek singer Andromache.

Discography

Extended plays 
 Lshoja zanin (2021)

Singles

As lead artist

As featured artist

Other charted songs

Songwriter credits

References 

1994 births
21st-century Albanian male singers
Albanian songwriters
Albanian-language singers
Festivali i Këngës contestants
Kosovo Albanians
Kosovan singers
Living people
Musicians from Pristina